Secret Plans is a 2014 Chinese animated film directed by He Cheng. It was released on September 26, 2014.

Voice cast
Liu Chunyan
Dong Hao
Ju Ping
Hong Guoguo
Lü Paopao
Maomao Chong

Plot
The movie follows the characters of the cartoon Big-Headed Kid and Small-Headed Father, telling the happiness and warmth of their family.

Reception
By September 28, it had earned ¥12 million at the Chinese box office.

References

2014 animated films
2014 films
Chinese animated films